26 Hydrae is a binary star system located 334 light years away from the Sun in the equatorial constellation of Hydra. It is visible to the naked eye as a faint, yellow-hued point of light with a combined apparent visual magnitude of 4.77, just a few degrees away from Alphard. The system is moving closer to the Earth with a leisurely radial velocity of -1 km/s.

Keenan and McNeil (1989) gave the brighter component a stellar classification of G7 III, matching an aging giant star. Houk and Swift (1999) have it classed as a G8II bright giant. This is a red clump giant, which indicates it is on the horizontal branch and is generating energy through helium fusion at its core. It has a high lithium abundance and displays a far infrared emission excess. The star is an estimated 510 million years old with 2.72 times the mass of the Sun and has expanded to 15 times the Sun's radius. It is radiating 139 times the luminosity of the Sun from its swollen photosphere at an effective temperature of 5,003 K.

References

G-type giants
G-type bright giants
Horizontal-branch stars
Binary stars
Hydra (constellation)
Durchmusterung objects
Hydrae, 26
080499
045751
3706